"You Don't Love Me" is a song by British indie rock band the Kooks from their 2006 debut album, Inside In / Inside Out. It was released 9 January 2006 as the lead single from that album, charting at number 12 in the UK Singles Chart.

Track listings
 CD (VSCDT1910)
 "You Don't Love Me" – 2:35
 "Slave to the Game" – 3:00

 7-inch (VS1910)
 "You Don't Love Me" – 2:35
 "Lonely Cat" – 3:00

 Maxi-CD (VSCDX1910)
 "You Don't Love Me" (live at the Garage) – 2:50
 "See the World" (acoustic - live at Abbey Road) – 2:25
 "The Window Song"
 "You Don't Love Me" (video)
 "See the World" (video)

Charts

Weekly charts

Year-end charts

References

2006 singles
2006 songs
The Kooks songs
Song recordings produced by Tony Hoffer
Virgin Records singles